The Triumph Tiger 110 is a British sports motorcycle that Triumph first made at their Coventry factory between 1953 and 1961.  The T110 was developed from the Triumph Thunderbird and first appeared in 1954.

Although it was supposed to be the sports model of the Triumph range, the Tiger 110 was later fitted with the rear paneling that was introduced with Triumph's 350cc 3TA twin in 1957. This rear cowling earned it the nickname 'bathtub' from its shape and made the T110 look somewhat staid. In any event, from 1959, the T120 Bonneville was now Triumph's leading sports model and before the introduction of Edward Turner's unit construction 650cc twin in 1962, the T110 was dropped from Triumph's range.

Development

The Triumph Tiger 110 650 cc OHV Twin was Triumph's fastest production motorcycle to date because it was developed for the American market, which wanted more power. The T110 was first built in 1953 and introduced as a 1954 model. The originally cast iron cylinder block and head soon were replaced with a light alloy cylinder head with special airways to improve cooling and austenitic iron valve seat inserts. The external oil feed pipes were also replaced with internal oilways via the pushrod tubes.

By 1959, the Tiger 110 was no longer Triumph's fastest model, the dual carburettor Bonneville T120 having taken its mantle. Triumph added the enclosed panels from the Twenty One which, resembling an upside-down Victorian slipper bathtub, earned the bike the nickname 'bathtub'.

World Speed Record
This success led to the development of the Tiger T110's successor - the Triumph Bonneville.

See also
List of motorcycles of the 1950s
List of Triumph motorcycles

References

External links

 Review on Real Classic including original brochure

Tiger 110
Land speed record motorcycles
Motorcycles introduced in the 1950s
Motorcycles powered by straight-twin engines